List of successful U-boats contains lists of the most successful German U-boats in the two World Wars based on total tonnage.

World War I 
This list contains the 5 most successful German U-boats during the First World War based on total tonnage. Only sunk commercial vessels are included, not military (warships) nor damaged ships.

World War II 
This list contains the 10 most successful German U-boats during the Second World War based on total tonnage. Both commercial and military vessels (warships) are included but only sunk ships are included, not damaged ships.

References
 uboat.net webpage about the most successful U-Boats of World War I - This list does not include military vessels.
 uboat.net webpage about the most successful U-Boats of World War II - This list does not include military vessels and is therefore not identical to list above.
 uboataces.com webpages about the most successful U-Boats of World War II - This list seems to miss U-123 in top 5 list.

U-boats
Submarines of Germany
U-Boats
U-Boats